Zithulele Hospital is a Provincial government funded hospital near Mqanduli, Eastern Cape in South Africa. While the postal address for the hospital is Mqanduli, the hospital itself is southeast approximately 3 km from the ocean.

The hospital departments include Emergency department, Paediatric ward, Maternity ward, Out Patients Department, Surgical Services, Medical Services, Operating Theatre & CSSD Services, Pharmacy, Anti-Retroviral (ARV) treatment for HIV/AIDS, Post Trauma Counseling Services, X-ray Services, Physiotherapy, NHLS Laboratory, Occupational Services, Laundry Services, Kitchen Services and Mortuary.

References

 Zithulele Hospital, Eastern Cape Dept of Health
 Zithulele Hospital website 
 Zithulele Hospital on Facebook

Hospitals in the Eastern Cape
King Sabata Dalindyebo Local Municipality